The World Today may refer to:

In print media:
 The World Today (magazine), an international current-affairs magazine published by Chatham House
 The World To-Day, a monthly magazine published from 1902-1912, a predecessor of Cosmopolitan
 World Today, the English-language translation of Bota Sot, a Kosovo newspaper

In radio:
 The World Today (Australian radio program), a radio news program by the Australian Broadcasting Corporation
 The World Today (radio programme), a radio news programme on the BBC World Service
 The World Today, a former news roundup program broadcast on the Mutual Broadcasting System
 The World Today, a former name of the weekend edition of CBS World News Roundup, a radio news broadcast on the CBS Radio Network

In television:
 The World Today (Philippine news series) (1972–1974), a former television news program on the GMA Network

In music:
 The World Today (album), a 2021 studio album by Troy Cassar-Daley